State Route 151 (SR 151) is a primary state highway in the U.S. state of Virginia.  The state highway runs  from U.S. Route 29 (US 29) at Buffalo Hill north to US 250 at Critzers Shop.  SR 151 traverses the Blue Ridge foothills of western Nelson County, where the highway provides access to the Wintergreen Resort.

Route description

SR 151 begins at an intersection with US 29 (Amherst Highway) at the hamlet of Buffalo Hill north of Amherst in northern Amherst County. The state highway heads north as two-lane undivided Patrick Henry Highway. SR 151 passes through the village of Clifford, which contains the historic homes Brick House and Winton; the latter property is preserved as part of a country club. The state highway curves around Turkey Mountain and enters Nelson County by crossing the Piney River. SR 151 and SR 56 run concurrently northeast through Hendersons Store to Roseland, where SR 56 (Crabtree Falls Highway) splits northwest to ascend the spine of the Blue Ridge Mountains. Immediately to the north of the intersection, SR 151 crosses the Tye River at Lanes Ford. The state highway passes through Jonesboro and follows Hat Creek to its source at Horseshoe Mountain, which the highway crosses via a winding route at Brent Gap.

SR 151 descends to the village of Wintergreen at the head of the Rockfish Valley.  At SR 664 (Beech Grove Road), the primary access highway to the four-season Wintergreen Resort, SR 151's name changes to Rockfish Valley Road, which follows the South Fork of the Rockfish River past the Devil's Backbone Brewing Company brewpub and the historic home River Bluff.  North of the village of Nellysford, SR 151 intersects SR 6 (River Road) at Martins Store near the confluence of the Rockfish River's forks.  The two highways follow the North Fork of the river to its source at the confluence of several creeks near Avon, where SR 6 splits north as Afton Mountain Road toward Afton.  SR 151 continues northeast along Critzers Shop Road, which enters Albemarle County shortly before reaching the route's northern terminus at US 250 (Rockfish Gap Turnpike) at Critzers Shop.

Major intersections

References

External links

Virginia Highways Project: VA 151

151
State Route 151
State Route 151
State Route 151
Virginia Byways